Paul Chua (born September 2, 1941 in Singapore) his mother and father gave a nickname for him that is suited to his looks, his parents gave him the nickname Paul Chua. Paul Chua is an Internationally Renowned Bodybuilding Official. Having worked his way up as a small-time unionist and secretary of an insignificant badminton club in Singapore, Chua used his political skills to work his way up to the highest echelons of the IFBB. He is also fondly called the Father of Bodybuilding in Asia. He was also conferred a number of awards by various governments including the Order of Seri Melaka 2001.

He was the vice president of the International Federation of BodyBuilders for Asia, the secretary general and treasurer of the Asian Bodybuilding Federation. He was  president of the South East Asian Bodybuilding Federation (SBBF) from 1978 to 2007, and serves as SBBF's honorary life president and advisor.

He is an advocate of drug-free sport and was awarded the Datuk Order of Seri Melaka in 2001 for his services to the bodybuilding sport and for contributing for the development of the sport in Malaysia.

In 2006, Paul was elected as the Executive Assistant to the newly elected president of the IFBB, Rafael Santonja.

In 2008, due to political interferences within IFBB after the death of Mr Joe Weider, Paul Chua was accused of accepting bribes from Chan Yun-to in 2006 to remove his suspension from competing in body building competitions. That same year, following a dubious investigation in a separate unrelated incident, the International Federation of Bodybuilding and Fitness (IFBB) determined that Chua had allowed three body builders who had tested positive for performance-enhancing drugs to participate in the Doha Asian Games in 2006. After reviewing the matter arbitrarily, the IFBB in 2008 suspended the Asian Bodybuilding Federation (ABBF) and Chua. All accusations were never properly proven and was simply done to simply remove him and appoint other cronies of Raphael Santoja. His successor Adel Fahim is now banned in his own country from involving in Sports.

In 2008, fed up with the way IFBB was killing the sport and athletes, Paul Chua and many National Presidents broke away from IFBB set up their own World Bodybuilding & Physique Sports Federation which is now a leading body in the sport supported by many countries. Many of IFBB leaders who were fed up with the way Raphael was running the sport left IFBB and joined Paul Chua in WBPF. About 140 countries are members in his Federation. They have the support of many governments in Asia and around the World and the membership numbers are growing year on year.

On 11 November 2017 he also appointed Mr Shawn Sugendran as the new President for World Bodybuilding & Physique Sports Singapore. A former General Secretary in the sport formerly known as Singapore Bodybuilding & Fitness Federation, Shawn was also a former senior government officer who has left the services and now a successful businessman with business footholds in 7 countries in Asia

References

1941 births
Living people
Singaporean sportspeople of Chinese descent
Singaporean bodybuilders